Lyudmila Mikhaylovna Alexeyeva (20 July 1927 – 8 December 2018) was a Russian historian and human-rights activist who was a founding member in 1976 of the Moscow Helsinki Watch Group and one of the last Soviet dissidents active in post-Soviet Russia.

Biography

Soviet period
In April 1968, Alexeyeva was expelled from the Communist Party and fired from her job at the publishing house. Nonetheless, she continued her activities in defense of human rights. From 1968 to 1972 she worked clandestinely as a typist for the first underground bulletin The Chronicle of Current Events devoted to human rights violations in the USSR.

In February 1977, Alexeyeva fled from the USSR to the United States following a crackdown against members of The Chronicle by Soviet authorities.  In the US Alexeyeva continued to advocate for human rights improvements in Russia and worked on a freelance basis for Radio Free Europe/Radio Liberty and Voice of America. She became a US citizen in 1982. She wrote regularly on the Soviet dissident movement for both English and Russian language publications in the US and elsewhere, and in 1985 she published the first comprehensive monograph on the history of the movement, Soviet Dissent (Wesleyan University Press). In addition, after moving to the United States, Alexeyeva took up freelance radio journalism for Radio Liberty and the Russian language section of the Voice of America. In 1990 she published The Thaw Generation, an autobiography that described the formation of the Soviet dissident movement and was co-written with Paul Goldberg.

Return to Russia
In 1989 she restarted the Moscow Helsinki Group following its dissolution in 1982. In 1993, after the dissolution of the Soviet Union, she returned to Russia, and she became a chairperson of the Moscow Helsinki Group in 1996.  In 2000, Alexeyeva joined a commission set up to advise President Vladimir Putin on human rights issues, a move that triggered criticism from some other rights activists.

Alexeyeva was critical of the Kremlin's human rights record and accused the government of numerous human rights violations including the regular prohibitions of non-violent meetings and demonstrations and encouragement of extremists with its nationalistic policies, such as the mass deportations of Georgians in 2006 and police raids against foreigners working in street markets. She has also criticized the law enforcers' conduct in Ingushetia and has warned that growing violence in the republic may spread to the whole Russian Federation. In 2006, she was accused by the Russian authorities of involvement with British intelligence and received threats from nationalist groups.

Strategy-31

From August 31, 2009, Alexeyeva was an active participant in Strategy-31 – the regular protest rallies of citizens on Moscow's Triumfalnaya Square in defense of the 31st Article (On the Freedom of Assembly) of the Russian Constitution. On December 31, 2009, during one of these attempted protests, Alexeyeva was detained by the riot police (OMON) and taken with scores of others to a police station. This event provoked strong reaction in Russia and abroad. Jerzy Buzek, the President of the European Parliament, was "deeply disappointed and shocked" at the treatment of Alexeyeva and others by the police. The National Security Council of the United States expressed "dismay" at the detentions. The New York Times published a front-page article about the protest rally ("Tested by Many Foes, Passion of a Russian Dissident Endures").

On March 30, 2010, Alexeyeva was assaulted in the Park Kultury metro station by a man as she was paying respect to the victims of the 2010 Moscow Metro Bombings. At the Lake Seliger youth camp, the Nashi youth movement branded her "a Nazi" and an enemy of the Russian people.

Alexeyeva was opposed to the 2014 Russian annexation of her native Crimea, saying "that the seizure of Crimea has shamed my country." On her 90th birthday she was visited at her home by Russian president Vladimir Putin (accompanied by a cameraman), despite her longstanding criticism of him.

She died in a Moscow hospital on 8 December 2018. No cause was given.   Alexeyeva's last words for publication were written to celebrate the seventieth anniversary of the Universal Declaration of Human Rights, although she actually died two days short of that anniversary.   She lamented the weakening of civil society through state propaganda and manipulation, and she drew attention to the weakness of legal culture and of democratic institutions in contemporary Russia, as well as political cynicism and populism which - not just in Russia - treat carelessly the systems and institutions necessary to support human values.

Awards and prizes 
Alexeyeva received the following awards and prizes for her human rights activities:

 2004 — Olof Palme Prize
 2005 — Person of the Year Prize of the Federation of the Jewish Communities of Russia
 2007 — The Order of the French Legion of Honour (Ordre national de la Légion d'honneur)
 2009 — The Order of Merit of the Federal Republic of Germany (Großes Verdienstkreuz der Bundesrepublik Deutschland)
 2009 — Sakharov Prize for Freedom of Thought
 2012 — The Order of the Cross of Terra Mariana, 3rd class
 2015 — The Václav Havel Human Rights Prize
 2017 — State Prize of the Russian Federation

Books, articles and interviews 
 
 
 
 
 
 
 
 
 
 
 
 
 
 
 
 
 
 
  (The Russian text of the book in full is available online on the Memorial website by click)

References

External links 

 Lyudmila Alexeyeva's blog on LiveJournal
 The Alexeyeva File, National Security Archive Electronic Briefing Book, 20 July 2012

Audiovisual material 
 
 
 
 
 
 
 

1927 births
2018 deaths
People from Yevpatoria
Moscow State University alumni
Moscow State University of Economics, Statistics, and Informatics alumni
20th-century Russian historians
Russian human rights activists
Soviet human rights activists
Soviet dissidents
Russian dissidents
Moscow Helsinki Group
Expelled members of the Communist Party of the Soviet Union
21st-century Russian women politicians
Commanders Crosses of the Order of Merit of the Federal Republic of Germany
Olof Palme Prize laureates
Recipients of the Legion of Honour
Recipients of the Order of the Lithuanian Grand Duke Gediminas
Recipients of the Order of the Cross of Terra Mariana, 3rd Class
Women human rights activists
Women historians